Aseki Airport  is an airport in Aseki, Papua New Guinea.

References

Airports in Papua New Guinea